The Premier League on NBC/Peacock is the blanket title for broadcasts of the Premier League by Peacock and the linear networks of NBC Sports. NBC acquired rights to the Premier League in 2013, and reached a six-year extension in 2015. In 2022, USA Network replaced NBCSN—which shut down on December 31, 2021—as the main cable broadcaster of the league.

History 
NBC acquired rights to the Premier League in 2013, replacing Fox Sports and ESPN. NBC's studio programming for the league includes the pre-match show Premier League Live, and the highlights shows Premier League Goal Zone and Match of the Day (modeled upon the similar BBC series). NBC Sports president of programming Jon Miller explained that their main goal was to not "Americanize" their coverage (besides providing explanations of terminology unfamiliar to U.S. viewers, such as referring to regional rivalries as "derbies"), citing their decision to employ talent (such as former ESPN UK and BBC Sport presenter Rebecca Lowe, who became NBC's lead host) who "know the Premier League and can talk about it intelligently". In 2014, NBC also hired the duo of Michael Davies and Roger Bennett—the "Men in Blazers"—to provide soccer-oriented content across NBC Sports' platforms.

Through the 2016–17 season, NBCSN operated pop-up channels branded as Premier League Extra Time, which aired overflow matches not shown by other NBC networks. Beginning with the 2017–18 season, NBC began to paywall many of these overflow games behind the "Premier League Pass" streaming service on NBC Sports Gold.

On Survival Sunday, the majority of NBCUniversal's cable networks carry games, including several networks not normally dedicated to sports.

Integration with Sky Sports, Peacock 
In 2019, NBCUniversal parent company Comcast acquired the British telecom and media conglomerate Sky plc. As a result, the NBC Sports division became a sibling to Sky Sports, a domestic rightsholder of the Premier League in the UK. Sky began to synergize with NBC Sports throughout 2019, beginning with a collaboration with its reporters for coverage of the transfer deadline, and adding a weekday simulcast from its Sky Sports News channel to the daytime lineup of NBCSN.

On-air collaboration with Sky Sports intensified with the beginning of the 2019–20 season; as Sky holds the first pick of matches for 12:30 p.m. (Eastern Time) kickoffs under its renewed contract, NBC will be able to air more prominent matches in its early-afternoon broadcasts. NBC also aired studio coverage of the first weekend of the season from Sky's studios, implemented a new on-air graphics package with elements of those used by Sky and its Premier League telecasts, and expanded its Sunday pre-match show to two hours (taking advantage of Sunday kickoffs being pushed later by half an hour). Sky Sports studio programming (including Soccer Saturday and Goals on Sunday among others) also became available on a secondary tier of Premier League Pass.

On July 9, 2020, NBC announced that Premier League Pass would be phased out, with its content (including non-televised matches and on-demand replays) being moved to Peacock Premium going forward, including 175 matches per-season. To mark the national launch of Peacock, all July 15, 2020 matches were carried exclusively by the service for free.

In July 2021, NBC announced that all matches on the NBC broadcast network will be simulcast on Peacock, and that noted Spanish football voice Andrés Cantor will call selected matches in English for NBC.

When the contract went up for renewal in 2021, the Premier League split its U.S. media rights into four packages (as it does with its domestic rights) to pursue the possibility of multiple broadcasters. On November 18, 2021, NBC Sports confirmed that it had reached a six-year extension of its exclusive rights to the Premier League through 2028. With NBCSN being discontinued at the end of 2021, USA Network would subsume its role as the main English-language cable outlet for NBC Sports' coverage. Ahead of the 2022-23 season, various reports said NBC appointed Peter Drury as the Premier League lead commentator to replace Arlo White, who filled the position for nine years. His position was confirmed on July 6, 2022.

List of personalities 
NBC Sports personalities:
 Studio hosts: Rebecca Lowe, Cara Banks, Ahmed Fareed, Paul Burmeister
 Studio analysts: Robbie Earle, Robbie Mustoe, Tim Howard, Danny Higginbotham, Stephen Warnock
 Play-by-play announcers: Peter Drury, Joe Speight, Andrés Cantor
 Color commentators: Lee Dixon, Graeme Le Saux, Stephen Warnock, Jim Beglin
 Contributor: Joe Prince-Wright, David Ornstein

Premier League Productions World Feed personalities:
 Studio hosts: Steve Bower, Manish Bhasin, Seema Jaswal
 Studio analysts: Alan Shearer, Ian Wright, Michael Owen, Tim Sherwood, Steve McManaman, Glenn Hoddle, Owen Hargreaves
Play-by-play announcers: Jim Proudfoot, Jonathan Beck, Chris Wise, Daniel Mann, Conor McNamara, Martin Tyler
 Color commentators: Jim Beglin, Lee Hendrie, Matt Holland, Andy Townsend

Sky Sports World Feed (Saturday 3pm Games) personalities:
Play-by-play announcers: Tony Jones, Ian Crocker, Gary Taphouse, Phil Blacker, David Stowell, Rob Palmer, Seb Hutchinson, Andy Bishop, Gary Weaver, Pien Meulensteen
 Color commentators: Garry Birtles, Leon Osman, Andy Walker, Keith Andrews, Tony Gale, Robert Green, Matthew Upson, Efan Ekoku, David Provan, Courtney Sweetman-Kirk

References

External links

 

2013 American television series debuts
NBCSN shows
NBC original programming
NBC